Kavya Keeran (born on 7 October 1994) is an Indian actress and model who has mostly appeared in Odia and Hindi films. She started her film career in Ollywood in 2013 through the 1st Odia 3D film Kaunri Kanya along with Pupul Bhuyan. In 2015, she debuted in Bollywood thorough Rang-E-Ishq. In 2019, she got the Odisha State Film Awards for Odia Film Khusi. In 2022, Kavya featured in a music video, Tu Ki Kitta by Rishi Singh.

Filmography

Web-series

References

External links
 
 
 

1994 births
Living people
Actresses in Odia cinema
Indian film actresses
21st-century Indian actresses
Female models from Odisha
Ollywood